Kushikino Dam  is a rockfill dam located in Kagoshima Prefecture in Japan. The dam is used for flood control. The catchment area of the dam is 13 km2. The dam impounds about 17  ha of land when full and can store 1660 thousand cubic meters of water. The construction of the dam was completed in 1970.

See also
List of dams in Japan

References

Dams in Kagoshima Prefecture